The King of the Kitchen is a 1918 American silent comedy film featuring Oliver Hardy.

Cast
 Harry Gribbon as The chef
 Rosa Gore as Owner of the house (as Rose Gore)
 Eva Novak as Gore's niece
 May Emory as A crooked lady (as Mae Emory)
 Billy Armstrong as A crooked gentleman
 Oliver Hardy as A German customer (as Babe Hardy)
 Merta Sterling

See also
 List of American films of 1918
 Oliver Hardy filmography

External links

1918 films
1918 short films
American silent short films
American black-and-white films
1918 comedy films
Films directed by Frank Griffin
Silent American comedy films
American comedy short films
1910s American films